The 2019 Slovak Cup Final (known as the Slovnaft Cup for sponsorship reasons) was the final match of the 2018–19 Slovak Cup, the 50th season of the top cup competition in Slovak football. The match was played at the Štadión pod Zoborom in Nitra on 1 May 2019 between FC Spartak Trnava and MŠK Žilina.

The winners of the final was automatically qualified to the first qualifying round of the 2019–20 UEFA Europa League.

Road to the final
Note: In all results below, the score of the finalist is given first (H: home; A: away).

Match

Details

See also

 2018–19 Slovak Cup
 2019–20 UEFA Europa League

References 

Slovak Cup Finals
2018–19 in Slovak football
Sport in Nitra
Slovak Cup Final
FC Spartak Trnava matches
MŠK Žilina matches
Slovak Cup Final 2019